Sarah Margaret Hagan (born May 24, 1984) is an American television and film actress.

Life and career
Hagan was born in Austin, Texas. She has been acting since the age of six, when her mother first signed her up for musical theater. Hagan was first involved with theater companies such as Houston's Playhouse 1960, the Houston Grand Opera (where she sang in the children's chorus), the Crighton Playhouse, the Houston Music Hall and the Bitter Truth Theater. From there, she made her screen debut in the 1997 feature film Faith, where she played the title character at age 13; her TV debut came on an episode of the Calista Flockhart series Ally McBeal in 1999.

Hagan's first major break came when she was cast in a recurring role as Millie Kentner on the short-lived NBC cult TV series Freaks and Geeks (1999–2000). Following that show's cancellation, she was cast on the David Alan Grier NBC sitcom DAG, where she was originally slated to play Camilla Whitman, daughter of the US President; however, the role of Camilla was recast when the pilot episode was revamped before airing.

Following the lead of several fellow Freaks and Geeks cast members, Hagan then appeared in an episode of the short-lived Fox sitcom Undeclared in 2001. Her next roles were a bit part in the Jack Black movie Orange County and a guest role as Melissa in Boston Public in 2002. After that, she was cast as Amanda in the seventh and final season of the hit cult series Buffy the Vampire Slayer.

In recent TV roles, Hagan appeared on the ABC medical drama Grey's Anatomy as Devo, a teenage girl whose religious beliefs conflict with getting treatment for a heart condition she was diagnosed with; she appeared on the NBC drama Medium, playing a character named Suzannah, a friend of Allison's (Patricia Arquette) who appeared in two dreams flashing back to Allison's teen years; and she played the role of Patricia on an episode of the CBS legal drama Close to Home. She made her first venture into animation in 2007 when she played the voices of Lola Llama and Jungle Girl on two episodes of the Cartoon Network series My Gym Partner's a Monkey.

Hagan next appeared in the direct-to-DVD Warner Bros. comedy feature Spring Breakdown. She appeared in the role of Sandy in the NCIS episode "Seek".

Filmography

Film

Television

References

External links

1984 births
20th-century American actresses
21st-century American actresses
American child actresses
American film actresses
American television actresses
Living people
Actresses from Austin, Texas